Bolton Great Moor Street railway station was the first station in Bolton. It was opened on 11 June 1831 by the Bolton and Leigh Railway.

Originally named Bolton, it was renamed Bolton Great Moor Street in October 1849. The original street level station was replaced by a temporary station at Bolton Crook Street Goods Yard on 1 August 1871 while the new station was built in a classic Italian style.  It opened either on 1 April 1875 or on 28 September 1874 on the same site as the original station but at a higher level. The rebuilt station had four platforms covered by a roof. Its reconstruction coincided with the building of the direct line to Manchester Exchange via Walkden Low Level by the London and North Western Railway which opened on 1 April 1875.

Local trains to and from Kenyon Junction via Chequerbent used the station's western platforms 1 & 2 whilst trains to and from Manchester Exchange via Walkden used Platforms 3 & 4.

The station closed for regular passenger use by British Railways on 29 March 1954, although holiday and football specials ran until 1958 and an unadvertised workmen's service to Monton Green continued for some months. An enthusiasts' special visited on 21 September 1963 and on 9 May 1964 another visited the adjacent Crook St goods yard, this was the last passenger train on LNWR lines in the Bolton area.

Tracks in the station were lifted in April 1964. The station was demolished in October 1966 and the area redeveloped.

See also
 B. Hick and Sons

References

Notes

Bibliography

External links
 The station on a 1948 OS map via npe maps
 The station on an 1885 series OS map overlay via National Library of Scotland
 The station and line via railwaycodes
 Railtour files via sixbellsjunction

History of Bolton
Former London and North Western Railway stations
Railway stations in Great Britain opened in 1831
Railway stations in Great Britain closed in 1954
Disused railway stations in the Metropolitan Borough of Bolton